This article displays the rosters for the teams competing at the 2019 FIBA Women's AmeriCup. Each team had to submit 12 players.

Age and club as of 22 September 2019.

Group A

Canada
A 16-player squad was announced on 8 September 2019.

Cuba

Dominican Republic

Mexico

Source:

Puerto Rico

Group B

Argentina
A 20-player squad was announced on 9 September 2019.

Brazil
A 18-player squad was announced on 26 August 2019.

Source:

Colombia

Source:

Paraguay

Source:

United States
The squad was announced on 19 September 2019.

References

External links
Official website

Squads
FIBA Women's AmeriCup squads